Tamil Nadu Magnesite Limited (TANMAG) is a state-government undertaking of Government of Tamil Nadu located in the Indian state of Tamil Nadu. It is mining & processing magnesite minerals in Salem Region.

Government of Tamilnadu formed TAMILNADU MAGNESITE LIMITED popularly known as TANMAG in January 1979. Company produce Dead Burnt Magnesite, Lightly Calcined Magnesite from raw Magnesite.

Company own captive mine and two factories to produce DBM and LCM of various grades.

Objectives 
TANMAG company have various objectives, that are listed below:
 Usage of mineral wealth for industrial growth
 Promotion of Socio-economic development
 Environment protection
 Maximum usage of mineral for various product

Process of winning of Raw Magnesite involves 

 Selection and preparation of Site
 Drilling
 Blasting
 Picking, dressing, sorting and stacking
 Removal of reject to spoil bank

TANMAG Products
 Lightly Calcined Magnesite
 Dead Burnt Magnesite
 Dunite
 Raw Magnesite (Slaty & Dust)

References

External links 
TANMAG – Official Website

Economy of Salem, Tamil Nadu
State agencies of Tamil Nadu
Companies based in Tamil Nadu
Mining companies of India
Mining in Tamil Nadu
1979 establishments in Tamil Nadu
Indian companies established in 1979